Agra City is a railway and bus station in the heart of the old city in Agra, India. It is near Belangunj, which is the trading hub of Agra. The station is a relic of the past and at present very few trains stop here.

Overview
Agra, the 16–17th century capital of the Mughals, is home to monuments such as the Taj Mahal and Agra Fort. The Taj Mahal attracts 7-8 million tourists annually. About 0.8 million foreign tourists visit it.

History
The station belonged to Great Indian Peninsula Railway in British era and was built in 1903 by Mistris of Kutch.

See also
 Agra Cantonment railway station
 Agra Fort railway station
 Railways in Agra

References

External links
 https://www.tajmahaldaytour.net/
 https://www.tajmahaldaytour.net/taj-mahal-tour-packages.html

Railway stations in Agra
Agra railway division
Railway stations opened in 1903